Rudolf Krajčovič (22 July 1927 in Trakovice – 29 October 2014) was a Slovak linguist and Slavist, the author of migration-integration theory about the origin of the Slovak language.

Life
He studied Slovak and philosophy at the Comenius University in Bratislava, later he worked in several positions at the Department of the Slovak Language and Literature (assistant, docent, professor since 1986). He worked abroad at various prestigious Slavist workplaces (Kraków 1963, Skopje 1977, Moscow 1970–1971, 1975–1976, 1980–1981). The secretary of the Association of Slovak Linguists (1957–1960), a member of the board (1966–1968), a vice-president (1968–1972). A vice-president of the Slovak Linguistic Society (1972–1973), a member of several international Slavist organizations.

Selected works
 1961 Vývin slovenského jazyka
 1964 Pôvod juhozápadoslovenských nárečí a ich fonologický vývin
 1974 Slovenčina a slovanské jazyky. Praslovanská genéza slovenčiny
 1975 A Historical Phonology of the Slovak Language
 1977 Svedectvo dejín o slovenčine
 1981 Pôvod a vývin slovenského jazyka
 1983 Čeština a slovenčina v starších archiváliách v predspisovnom období
 1985 Veľká Morava v tisícročí slovami prameňov, legiend, kroník a krásnej spisby
 1988 Vývin slovenského jazyka a dialektológia
 1990 Dejiny spisovnej slovenčiny. Študijná príručka a texty
 2005 Živé kroniky slovenských dejín skryté v názvoch obcí a miest

Awards
 1971 Plaque of Comenius University
 1977 Bronze Medal of Comenius University
 1987 Silver Medal of Comenius University 
 1986 Commemorative Medal of Ľudovít Štúr
 1987 Medal of Comenius University
 1995 Commemorative Medal of Pavol Jozef Šafárik University
 1997 Gold Medal of Faculty of Philosophy of Comenius University
 1997 Honors of the Minister of Culture of the Slovak Republic

References 

1927 births
2014 deaths
Academic staff of Comenius University
Linguists from Slovakia
Dialectologists
Slavists
Comenius University alumni
People from Hlohovec District